Events from the year 1961 in France.

Incumbents
President: Charles de Gaulle 
Prime Minister: Michel Debré

Events
8 January – French referendum on Algerian self-determination is approved by three-quarters of voters.
18 March – A ceasefire takes effect in the Algerian War of Independence.
21 April-26 April – Algiers putsch, failed coup d'état attempt organized by four retired French army generals.
31 May
Rebel generals Maurice Challe and Andre Zelelr are sentenced to 15 years in prison.
President John F. Kennedy and Charles De Gaulle meet in Paris.
17 June – A Paris-to-Strasbourg train derails near Vitry-le-François; 24 are killed, 109 injured.
21 September – Organisation armée secrète (OAS) slips an anti-de Gaulle message into TV programming.
October – The Renault 4, a small estate car similar in concept to the Citroen 2CV saloon, is launched at the Paris Salon.
10 October – Simca launches the Simca 1000, a small rear-engined four-door family saloon.
17 October – Paris massacre, French police attacked an unarmed and peaceful demonstration of some 30,000 Algerians. Government acknowledged 40 deaths in 1998, although there are estimates of up to 200.
Fashion brand Yves Saint Laurent is launched by Yves Saint Laurent and Pierre Bergé.

Arts and literature
4 May – Phenomenological philosopher Maurice Merleau-Ponty dies, age 53, of a stroke, apparently while preparing for a class on Descartes.

Sport
18 June – French Grand Prix won by Giancarlo Baghetti of Italy.
25 June – Tour de France begins.
19 July – Tour de France ends, won by Jacques Anquetil.

Births
15 April – José Anigo, soccer player and sporting director
16 May – Solveig Dommartin, actress (died 2007)
21 September – Philippe Anziani, soccer player and coach
29 September – Jean-Marie Neff, racewalker
9 October – Martial Fesselier, racewalker
25 December – Ghislaine Maxwell, British socialite

Deaths
3 May – Maurice Merleau-Ponty, phenomenological philosopher (born 1908)
29 June – Georges Guillain, neurologist (born 1876)
1 July – Louis-Ferdinand Céline, writer (born 1894)

See also
 1961 in French television
 List of French films of 1961

References

1960s in France